Defending champion Monica Seles successfully defended her title, defeating Martina Navratilova in the final, 6–4, 3–6, 7–5, 6–0 to win the singles tennis title at the 1991 Virginia Slims Championships.

Seeds

Draw

 NB: The Final was the best of 5 sets while all other rounds were the best of 3 sets.

References

Singles 1991
1991 WTA Tour